Poria Illit (lit. "Upper Poria") is a community settlement in northern Israel. Located  near the  southwestern shore of the Sea of Galilee, it falls under the jurisdiction of Emek HaYarden Regional Council.

History
Poria was first settled in 1912 and operated as a farm run by Jewish immigrants from the Second Aliyah. However, the original residents left after the outbreak of World War I, and the land was abandoned until 1940.

That year a group of settlers (kvutza) affiliated with the socialist-Zionist Noar HaOved (Working Youth) movement, Alumot, settled in the area. They renovated the original basalt stone houses, naming the village Poria Alumot. In 1947 they were given a permanent site for their kibbutz at Bitania Illit, on a hill opposite Poria. The new kibbutz was named Alumot.

Another kibbutz founded in its place was dissolved in 1949 and most of the residents moved to Alumot. Poria Illit was established  in 1955. In 1991 it was officially recognized as  distinct from Poria – Neve Oved.

According to the Company for Location and Restitution of Holocaust Victims' Assets, there are 65 plots in Poria that were purchased by Jews who were later murdered in the Holocaust.

Health care
Poriya Medical Center was founded in 1955, replacing Schweitzer Hospital. The center incorporates a maternity hospital owned by the Scottish Church that was previously located in Tiberias. In 2005, the center was renamed for Prof. Baruch Padeh, former director-general of the Ministry of Health, who headed the hospital in 1974–1976. Located on Poriya Ridge above Tiberias, it serves the population of Tiberias, Golan Heights, Jordan Valley, Lower Galilee, kibbutzim and moshavim.

References

Community settlements
Populated places established in 1912
Populated places established in 1940
Populated places established in 1955
Jewish villages in the Ottoman Empire
Populated places in Northern District (Israel)
1912 establishments in the Ottoman Empire
1940 establishments in Mandatory Palestine
1955 establishments in Israel